Daniel John Birch (born 21 January 1981) is a cricketer born at Nottingham, who made 130 on his first-class debut for Derbyshire in April 2007. He also scored 95 on his Championship debut against Gloucestershire.

Prior to signing for Derbyshire, Birch had been playing Premier League Club Cricket in the county before Kent signed him in 2006, however he never made the first team and signed for Derbyshire soon after. In 2010, he joined Lincolnshire to play minor counties cricket.

References

1981 births
Living people
Derbyshire cricketers
English cricketers
Lincolnshire cricketers